Mat Salleh is a Malay term used as a colloquial expression to refer to white people. The exact origins of the expression are difficult to ascertain, due to there being several versions of the term's origin being passed down via word of mouth, with little or no official documentation to support such oral claims. The term arose during the colonial period of Malaysian history and is still commonly used.

Etymology 

One etymological story claims the word might have been derived from the colloquial expression "mad sailor". The first encounter many Malaysians had with white foreigners were dignified and upper-class colonial officials, leading the Malays to both admire these foreigners and assume all white people behaved as such. When warships began to put into Malaysian ports to collect supplies, sailors were given leave to disembark their ships and spend time in port. These were typically working-class men who enjoyed getting drunk and brawling amongst themselves. These behaviours shocked the Malays, who swiftly inquired to the colonial officials concerning the puzzling behaviour of the sailors. The colonial officials, not wishing the Malay image of them to dissipate, dismissed them as mere "mad sailors".

Another etymological story claims the term derives from another term which was applied to shipwrecked sailors who became stranded on Malaysian shores. Upon encountering the native Malays, the story claims that many of these sailors ran away, assuming the Malays to be cannibals, with their erratic actions being deemed as "mad sailors" by other Europeans the Malays encountered.

See also
 List of ethnic slurs

References

External links
Pusat Rujukan Persuratan Melayu
Kamus Bahasa Indonesia dalam jaringan

Pejorative terms for white people
Ethno-cultural designations
Malaysian culture
Malay words and phrases
Manglish
Racism in Asia